Subarya (Hubariaa) is a rural locality (an ulus) in Okinsky District, Republic of Buryatia, Russia. The population was 26 as of 2010. There are 4 streets.

Geography 
Subarya is located 32 km south of Orlik (the district's administrative centre) by road. Khurga is the nearest rural locality.

References 

Rural localities in Okinsky District